Lady's Tree is a Scots pine on the banks of the Loch of the Lowes, Scotland. It was the roost of famous osprey 'Lady' for 24 years. In 2014, Lady's Tree was named Scotland's Tree of the Year.

Description 
Scots pines are large, evergreen trees, which are native to the United Kingdom. It takes its name from the Loch of the Lowe's famous osprey, known as 'Lady'. Lady was one of the world's oldest known breeding osprey and made an important contribution to the conservation of her species, laying 71 eggs and raising 50 chicks over her time in Lady's Tree.  2014, the year Lady's Tree won Scotland's Tree of the Year, was Lady's last year in the tree.  

In 2004, the Scottish Wildlife Trust set up a camera in the tree, and livestreamed the feed of the osprey nest. This feed has been viewed 1.3 million times from over 160 countries.

References 

Individual trees in Scotland
Individual pine trees